Pyankovo is a rural locality (a village) in Vereshchaginsky District, Perm Krai, Russia. The population was 29 as of 2010.

Geography 
Pyankovo is located 28 km west of Vereshchagino (the district's administrative centre) by road. Sidoryata is the nearest rural locality.

References 

Rural localities in Vereshchaginsky District